Money Talks is a 1932 British comedy film directed by Norman Lee and starring Julian Rose, Kid Berg and Judy Kelly. It was made at Elstree Studios by British International Pictures. A separate French-language version Lost Money was also released.

Cast
 Julian Rose as Abe Pilstein  
 Kid Berg as Kid Burke  
 Gladdy Sewell as Anna  
 Judy Kelly as Rosie Pilstein  
 Gus McNaughton as Solly Sax  
 Griffith Jones as Jimmy Dale  
 Bernard Ansell as Hymie Burkowitz 
 Lena Maitland as Mrs. Blumberg  
 Hal Gordon as Pug Wilson  
 Mary Charles as Nellie Kelly  
 Jimmy Godden as Joe Bell

References

Bibliography
 Low, Rachael. Filmmaking in 1930s Britain. George Allen & Unwin, 1985.
 Wood, Linda. British Films, 1927-1939. British Film Institute, 1986.

External links

1932 films
British comedy films
1932 comedy films
Films shot at British International Pictures Studios
Films directed by Norman Lee
Films set in England
Films set in London
British boxing films
British multilingual films
British black-and-white films
1932 multilingual films
1930s English-language films
1930s British films